William Hodding Carter III (born April 7, 1935) is an American journalist and politician.  He was Assistant Secretary of State for Public Affairs in the Jimmy Carter administration.

Life and career
Carter was born in New Orleans to journalist and publisher William Hodding Carter, II (1907–1972), and the former Betty Werlein (1910–2000). He grew up in Greenville, Mississippi, a Mississippi River delta city which is the seat of Washington County, Mississippi. Carter attended Greenville High School before transferring to Phillips Exeter Academy in New Hampshire. He ultimately returned to Greenville and graduated in 1953. He then attended Princeton University, from which he graduated summa cum laude in 1957. That same year, he married the former Margaret Ainsworth. They had a son, Hodding Carter IV (born 1962), and three daughters, Catherine Carter, Margaret Carter, and actress Finn Carter (born 1960). The couple divorced in 1978, and Carter that same year married Patricia M. Derian, a human rights official in the Carter administration and an author on topics relating to foreign policy, civil rights, and the "New South".

Carter has a brother, Philip Dutartre Carter (born 1939), former publisher of the Delta Democrat-Times, of Greenville, the newspaper started by their father and later publisher of the Vieux Carré Courier and financier of the weekly paper Gambit, both of New Orleans. Another brother, Thomas Hennen Carter (1945–1964), killed himself while playing Russian roulette.

After Princeton, Carter served in the United States Marine Corps for two years. In 1959, he began working for the Delta Democrat-Times as a reporter. He was thereafter the paper's managing editor and associate publisher. He covered, among many topics, the Civil Rights Movement and the rise of the Mississippi Republican Party, particularly under its chairman, Clarke Reed, a Greenville businessman and personal friend of Carter's despite their political differences.

Carter wrote the book The South Strikes Back. He won the Sigma Delta Chi National Profession Journalism Society Award for Editorial Writing in 1961.

In the 1960s, Carter was involved in the Civil Rights Movement, both editorially and in political action. In 1968, he co-chaired the "Loyal Democrats of Mississippi" that replaced Mississippi's previously all- white delegation to the Democratic National Convention, but later criticized the Delta Ministry (part of the biracial coalition) in his editorials.

In 1964, he worked on Lyndon B. Johnson's presidential campaign, but Johnson and his vice-presidential choice, U.S. Senator Hubert H. Humphrey of Minnesota, received only 13 percent of the vote in Mississippi in the last election held prior to passage of the Voting Rights Act of 1965. Carter also worked on Jimmy Carter's campaign in 1976. President Carter appointed him Assistant Secretary of State for Public Affairs and State Department spokesman.

Because of the Iran Hostage Crisis, Carter came into the public eye much more frequently than most of his predecessors and successors.

When Ronald W. Reagan was elected in 1980, Carter left his post in the government and moved into television as a major critic of Reagan’s policies. Up until 1994, he held various positions for ABC, BBC, CBC, CNN, NBC, and PBS, including anchor, political commentator, panelist, and reporter. His most notable television work was as the host of the media criticism show Inside Story on PBS. Throughout the 1980s, he was one of the rotating guest panelists for the roundtable segment of This Week with David Brinkley, while he also regularly wrote op-ed columns for various newspapers including The Wall Street Journal. He gave the 1986 commencement speech at George Washington University.

Beginning in 1994, he served as the Knight Professor of Public Affairs Journalism at the University of Maryland at College Park, Maryland. He resigned the post in 1998 to become the president of the Knight Foundation. He serves on a commission funded by the foundation, the Knight Commission on Intercollegiate Athletics.

Since then, Carter has lectured at universities all over the country and continued to do freelance work for the television and print media. His most recent position is University Professor of Leadership and Public Policy at the University of North Carolina at Chapel Hill.

Carter contributed to After Snowden: Privacy, Secrecy, and Security in the Information Age, published in May 2015.

References

External links

Oral History Interview with Hodding Carter from Oral Histories of the American South
Interview from The State of Things (radio show) on February 28, 2011
Hodding Carter III
Tangled Nicaragua: An Exchange | by Tony Jenkins | The New York Review of Books

1935 births
American male journalists
American newspaper editors
American newspaper publishers (people)
United States Assistant Secretaries of State
Living people
Politicians from Greenville, Mississippi
Writers from New Orleans
Phillips Exeter Academy alumni
Princeton University alumni
University of North Carolina at Chapel Hill faculty
Mississippi Democrats
Journalists from Mississippi
United States Department of State spokespeople